Cyrene is an unincorporated community in southeast Pike County, in the U.S. state of Missouri. The community is on US Route 61 approximately six miles southeast of Bowling Green.

History
A post office called Cyrene was established in 1879, and remained in operation until 1964. The community was named after Cyrene, Libya, a place mentioned in the Bible.

References

Unincorporated communities in Pike County, Missouri
Unincorporated communities in Missouri